Pauvert is a surname. Notable people with the surname include: 

Jean-Jacques Pauvert (1926–2014), French publisher
Sébastien Pauvert (born 1977), French football player